Spaceball(s) or variation, may refer to:

TV and film
 "Spaceball" (Battlestar Galactica), an episode of the short lived science fiction series Galactica 1980
 Spaceballs, a 1987 science fiction spoof film directed by and starring Mel Brooks
 Spaceballs: The Animated Series, an animated television spin-off of the film

Music
 Spaceballs (demogroup), a Norwegian demoscene group
 Spaceball (album), a 1976 album by Larry Young

Other uses
 space ball, a carefully weighted ball used in skydiving
 space-ball, a 3-ball
 Spaceball (computing), a 6DOF input device

See also
 Spaceball Revolution, a game published and developed for the Wii in 2009